is a Japanese hammer thrower. Her personal best throw is 67.26 metres, achieved in August 2006 in Toyama.

International competitions

References

1980 births
Living people
Japanese female hammer throwers
Asian Games bronze medalists for Japan
Asian Games medalists in athletics (track and field)
Athletes (track and field) at the 2002 Asian Games
Athletes (track and field) at the 2006 Asian Games
Athletes (track and field) at the 2014 Asian Games
Medalists at the 2002 Asian Games
Medalists at the 2006 Asian Games
World Athletics Championships athletes for Japan
Asian Athletics Championships winners
Japan Championships in Athletics winners
21st-century Japanese women